William Henry Abbott (February 18, 1888 – December 21, 1974) was a merchant and politician in the Dominion of Newfoundland. He represented Port au Port in the Newfoundland House of Assembly from 1928 to 1934 as a Conservative and then United Newfoundland Party member.

He was born in Marches Point, Cape St. George and was educated at Saint Bonaventure's College in St. John's. In 1903, he joined the family business, Abbott and Haliburton. Abbott was elected to the Newfoundland assembly in 1928 and reelected in 1932. He was government representative on the board of directors of the International Pulp and Paper Co. and served on the board of governors for the Newfoundland Broadcasting Company from 1939 to 1949.

Abbott died in Stephenville at the age of 86.

References 

1888 births
1974 deaths
Members of the Newfoundland and Labrador House of Assembly
Dominion of Newfoundland politicians